Computational Engineering is a relatively new discipline that deals with the development and application of computational models for engineering. As an emerging field, there is still some ambiguity as to what constitutes Computational Engineering. Some see it as a mostly simulation-driven approach to engineering challenges. Others see it as a way to use computer algorithms to mimic the way engineers work, sometimes coupled with some aspect of AI. 

Simulations of physical behaviors relevant to the field, often coupled with high-performance computing, to solve complex physical problems arising in engineering analysis and design (computational engineering) as well as natural phenomena (computational science). CSE has been described as the "third mode of discovery" (next to theory and experimentation). 

In many fields, computer simulation is essential to business and research. Computer simulation provides the capability to enter fields that are either inaccessible to traditional experimentation or where carrying out traditional empirical inquiries is prohibitively expensive. CSE should neither be confused with pure computer science, nor with computer engineering, although a wide domain in the former is used in CSE (e.g., certain algorithms, data structures, parallel programming, high performance computing) and some problems in the latter can be modeled and solved with CSE methods (as an application area).

It is typically offered as a masters or doctorate program.

Methods
Computational Science and Engineering methods and frameworks include:
 High performance computing and techniques to gain efficiency (through change in computer architecture, parallel algorithms etc.)
 Modeling and simulation
 Algorithms for solving discrete and continuous problems
 Analysis and visualization of data
 Mathematical foundations: Numerical and applied linear algebra, initial & boundary value problems, Fourier analysis, optimization
 Data Science for developing methods and algorithms to handle and  extract  knowledge from large scientific data
With regard to computing, computer programming, algorithms, and parallel computing play a major role in CSE. The most widely used programming language in the scientific community is FORTRAN. Recently, C++ and C have increased in popularity over FORTRAN. Due to the wealth of legacy code in FORTRAN and its simpler syntax, the scientific computing community has been slow in completely adopting C++ as the lingua franca. Because of its very natural way of expressing mathematical computations, and its built-in visualization capacities, the proprietary language/environment MATLAB is also widely used, especially for rapid application development and model verification. Python along with external libraries (such as NumPy, SciPy, Matplotlib) has gained some popularity as a free and Copycenter alternative to MATLAB.

Applications

Computational Science and Engineering finds diverse applications, including in:
  Aerospace Engineering and Mechanical Engineering: combustion simulations, structural dynamics, computational fluid dynamics, computational thermodynamics, computational solid mechanics, vehicle crash simulation, biomechanics, trajectory calculation of satellites
 Astrophysical systems
 Battlefield simulations and military gaming, homeland security, emergency response
 Biology and Medicine: protein folding simulations (and other macromolecules), bioinformatics, genomics, computational neurological modeling, modeling of biological systems (e.g., ecological systems), 3D CT ultrasound, MRI imaging, molecular bionetworks, cancer and seizure control
 Chemistry: calculating the structures and properties of chemical compounds/molecules and solids, computational chemistry/cheminformatics, molecular mechanics simulations, computational chemical methods in solid state physics, chemical pollution transport
 Civil Engineering: finite element analysis, structures with random loads, construction engineering, water supply systems, transportation/vehicle modeling
 Computer Engineering, Electrical Engineering, and Telecommunications: VLSI, computational electromagnetics, semiconductor modeling, simulation of microelectronics, energy infrastructure, RF simulation, networks
 Epidemiology: influenza spread
 Environmental Engineering and Numerical weather prediction: climate research, Computational geophysics (seismic processing), modeling of natural disasters
 Finance: derivative pricing, risk management
 Industrial Engineering: discrete event and Monte-Carlo simulations (for logistics and manufacturing systems for example), queueing networks, mathematical optimization
 Material Science: glass manufacturing, polymers, and crystals
 Nuclear Engineering: nuclear reactor modeling, radiation shielding simulations, fusion simulations
 Petroleum engineering: petroleum reservoir modeling, oil and gas exploration
 Physics: Computational particle physics, automatic calculation of particle interaction or decay, plasma modeling, cosmological simulations 
 Transportation

See also
 Modeling and simulation
 Applied mathematics
 Computational science
 Computational mathematics
 Computational fluid dynamics
 Computational electromagnetics
 High-performance computing
 Engineering mathematics
 Grand Challenges
 Numerical analysis
 Multiphysics

References

External links
Oden Institute for Computational Engineering and Sciences
Scope of Computational engineering
Society of Industrial and Applied Mathematics
 International Centre for Computational Engineering (IC2E)
 Georgia Institute of Technology, USA, MS/PhD Programme Computational Science & Engineering
 The graduate program for the University of Tennessee at Chattanooga
 Master and PhD Program in Computational Modeling at Rio de Janeiro State University
 Computational Science and Engineering with Scilab
 Internacional Center for Numerical Methods in Engineering (CIMNE)

Computational science
Computational fields of study